Jules Roulleau (1855, Libourne - 1895, Paris) was a French sculptor. He produced a monumental sculpture of Joan of Arc at Chinon. His other sculptures include Lazare Carnot at Nolay, Théodore de Banville in the Jardin du Luxembourg in Paris and Nicolas Appert (1893) at the Musée des Beaux-Arts de Châlons-en-Champagne.

1855 births
1895 deaths
People from Libourne
19th-century French sculptors
French male sculptors
École des Beaux-Arts alumni
Prix de Rome for sculpture
Chevaliers of the Légion d'honneur
19th-century French male artists